The 1996 City of Lincoln Council election took place on 2 May 1996. This was on the same day as other local elections. One third of the council was up for election: the seats of which were last contested in 1992. The Labour Party retained control of the council.

Overall results

|-
| colspan=2 style="text-align: right; margin-right: 1em" | Total
| style="text-align: right;" | 11
| colspan=5 |
| style="text-align: right;" | 20,417
| style="text-align: right;" | 

All comparisons in vote share are to the corresponding 1992 election.

Ward results

Abbey

Birchwood

Boultham

Bracebridge

Carholme

Castle

Longdales

Minster

Moorland

Park

Tritton

By-elections between 1996 and 1998

References

1996
1996 English local elections
1990s in Lincolnshire